Stanton "Stiga" Fredericks (born 13 June 1978) is a South African former association football player who played as midfielder and has represented South Africa. Stanton retired from football in May 2013.

Career
Fredericks previously had a loan spell at Supersport United. He also spent three seasons with FC Moscow, appearing in 13 Russian Premier League matches.

Career statistics

International

Statistics accurate as of match played 31 January 2004

References

External links

1978 births
South African soccer players
South Africa international soccer players
South African expatriate soccer players
Olympic soccer players of South Africa
Footballers at the 2000 Summer Olympics
Living people
Cape Coloureds
FC Moscow players
Orlando Pirates F.C. players
Grasshopper Club Zürich players
Kaizer Chiefs F.C. players
Pierikos F.C. players
SuperSport United F.C. players
Bidvest Wits F.C. players
Swiss Super League players
Russian Premier League players
2004 African Cup of Nations players
Association football midfielders
Expatriate footballers in Switzerland
Expatriate footballers in Greece
Expatriate footballers in Russia
Sportspeople from Johannesburg
South African expatriate sportspeople in Russia
South African expatriate sportspeople in Switzerland
South African expatriate sportspeople in Greece